Bela simplicata is a species of sea snail, a marine gastropod mollusk in the family Mangeliidae.

Description
The length of the shell varies between 5 mm and 8 mm, its diameter between 2 mm and 3 mm.

It shows a close resemblance to Oenopota pyramidalis (Strøm, 1788) (synonym: Bela pyramidalis), but it is smaller and shorter. The spire is less acuminate. The body whorl is higher. The aperture is not as high. The shell contains less longitudinal ribs, which become obsolete at the body whorl where they are replaced by plicae.

Distribution
This species occurs in the Bay of Biscay off France ar depths between 650 m and 1410 m.

References

External links
 Worldwide Mollusc Species Data Base: Mangeliidae
  Tucker, J.K. 2004 Catalog of recent and fossil turrids (Mollusca: Gastropoda). Zootaxa 682:1-1295.

simplicata